Chris Madden (born March 27, 1978) is an American retired professional ice hockey goalie.

Career 
Before turning pro, Madden played for the Guelph Storm of the Ontario Hockey League, where he won the Hap Emms Memorial Trophy as the top goaltender during the Memorial Cup in 1998 and the Stafford Smythe Memorial Trophy as the Memorial Cup MVP. He was also named to the 1998 Memorial Cup All-Star team. 

Madden was drafted by the Carolina Hurricanes 97th overall in the 1998 NHL Entry Draft.

References

External links

1978 births
Living people
American men's ice hockey goaltenders
Augusta Lynx players
Bridgeport Sound Tigers players
Carolina Hurricanes draft picks
Guelph Storm players
Hamilton Bulldogs (AHL) players
Ice hockey players from New York (state)
Long Beach Ice Dogs (ECHL) players
Macon Whoopee (ECHL) players
Milwaukee Admirals players
People from Liverpool, New York
Providence Bruins players
Toronto Roadrunners players